is a video game for the Nintendo Wii based on the manga and anime series One Piece by Eiichiro Oda, released in Japan on April 26, 2007 and in North America on January 22, 2008. The NTSC (American) version of the game uses the FUNimation voice actors exclusively.

A sequel, One Piece: Unlimited Cruise, was released for the Wii in 2008.

Gameplay
Story Mode
A basic adventure game with platforms, puzzles, and item collecting. To go farther in the game, the player must collect certain items for Franky and Usopp to make new tools in order to create new paths. Fishing and bug hunting are also major side quests; certain bugs and fish have to be captured to break seals.

Vs. Mode
The player can choose from any of the over 40 characters that have appeared in the game (including basic enemies and final boss) in the battle mode. The player can play in fight against a computer or a friend in the Vs. Mode.

Survival Mode
The player can choose one character from any of the over 40 characters that have appeared in the game (including basic enemies and final boss) and fight against 1000 opponents.

Plot
The Straw Hat Pirates aboard the Thousand Sunny are in peril as food and water supplies are running low. After Luffy reveals that he, Usopp, and Chopper wasted all the food in an eating contest, Sanji makes him and Chopper fish to make up for their loss, as well as Usopp looking out for any nearby islands to restock. Instead of catching any tasty fish, Luffy catches what appears to be a jewel. He tries to show the others his newfound mystery jewel, but no one is interested. They are more worried about the lack of food. "Can't eat it, we don't need it." Luffy decides to use a Gum-Gum Rocket to launch himself into the air to get a better view hoping to see an island. Somehow, the jewel reacts and an island emerges from the sea, under the Thousand Sunny.

Luffy and company decide to search the island for the "Hidden Treasure" which can only be found by breaking all the seals. A strange creature is trying to prevent them from breaking the seals. Not knowing what he is protecting the Straw Hat Pirates decide to go along with breaking the seals as they look for their missing ship.

Over time, it is revealed that the seal is preventing the revival of an evil monster that the island's original inhabitants had created in the hopes of protecting themselves from invaders, and that Popora, the island's guardian, has been living alone for 1,000 years since his creator's death, preventing the creature's revival. Luffy and the other Straw Hats decide to help him, breaking the final seals and defeating the monster. After their victory, Popora's creator returns and, to reward him for his service, turns the island into a paradise and allows him to live with several creatures like him. The Straw Hat Pirates sail off after replenishing their food supplies.

Advertisement
Unlimited Adventure was announced for the Wii at E3 2006 with an early demo, the clips of that build featured Luffy, some enemy Marines and the use of the Net with motion controls to catch a bug. Much of the on screen graphics have changed since then. The Health Bar was different, as well as the characters having a much more traditional Leveling system. Another change was the Gem Level Up screen. As well as the map in the demos being a completely different looking island.

The game lacked any television or website ads in the U.S. Websites such as GameTrailers had online trailers, clips, and teasers, including Smoker, Crocodile, and Arlong's clips, as well as the highly spoilering Franky clip; which revealed his voice for the first time. Unlimited Adventure opening sequence was also revealed in English on Game Trailers, as well as Japanese clips. And Few weeks before the game's release dates, Funimation and Bandai Namco created a website to promote the game.

Outside the Internet, the only ads to be seen was entire page ads and game preview articles. Although the preview article stated that there will be "8 Straw Hats to choose from", the English adaptation was only up to Robin's addition to the main cast. In the single page ad, the Thousand Sunny blatantly made an appearance. It wouldn't appear for another 300 chapters in the English Manga. Also, Franky and the Thousand Sunny are both considered a huge spoiler to the series in the United States.

Franky, although confirmed to be in the game, was taken out of all ads, and the game's box art was edited to take him out. Besides on the actual game, Franky only appears as a cameo in the game's instruction manual and is a featured character on an ad packed in with the Episode of Alabasta: The Desert Princess and the Pirates DVD.

Reception

The game was met with average reception upon release, as GameRankings gave it a score of 69.83%, while Metacritic gave it 67 out of 100.

Notes

References

External links

English
 Ganbarion's official website
Japanese
 Namco Bandai Game's official website
 Ganbarion's official website

2007 video games
Action-adventure games
Ganbarion games
Multiplayer and single-player video games
Unlimited Adventure
Video games developed in Japan
Wii games
Wii-only games